Nitric-oxide synthase (NAD(P)H-dependent) (nitric oxide synthetase, NO synthase) is an enzyme with systematic name L-arginine,NAD(P)H:oxygen oxidoreductase (nitric-oxide-forming). This enzyme catalyses the following chemical reaction

 2 L-arginine + 3 NAD(P)H + 3 H+ + 4 O2  2 L-citrulline + 2 nitric oxide + 3 NAD(P)+ + 4 H2O (overall reaction)
(1a) 2 L-arginine + 2 NAD(P)H + 2 H+ + 2 O2  2 N-omega-hydroxy-L-arginine + 2 NAD(P)+ + 2 H2O 
(1b) 2 N-omega-hydroxy-L-arginine + NAD(P)H + H+ + 2 O2  2 L-citrulline + 2 nitric oxide + NAD(P)+ + 2 H2O

Nitric-oxide synthase (NAD(P)H-dependent) binds heme (iron protoporphyrin IX) and tetrahydrobiopterin.

See also 
 Nitric oxide synthase

References

External links 
 

EC 1.14.13